Joy Kiriau Kere is a diplomat from the Solomon Islands. In 2014 she was appointed the first Solomon Islands High Commissioner to New Zealand, becoming the country's first woman to head a foreign mission abroad. Her term ended in 2020.

Life 
Kere was the Permanent Secretary to the Ministry of Foreign Affairs and External Trade prior to her appointment as High Commissioner.

References

Living people
Solomon Islands diplomats
High Commissioners of the Solomon Islands
Women ambassadors
Year of birth missing (living people)